Dean Heil is a former folkstyle wrestler from Brunswick, Ohio. Heil wrestled collegiately at Oklahoma State, where he was a three-time All-American and two-time NCAA champion.

High school career
At St. Edward High School (Lakewood, Ohio) he was a four-time OHSAA champion at four different weight classes while wrestling for Greg Urbas.  He was also 2011 champion at the Walsh Ironman.

College career

2015 season
In 2015, Heil was an All-American (top 8 finish) by virtue of finishing fourth at the 2015 NCAA Division I Wrestling Championships.

2016 season
He won an individual title at the 2016 NCAA Division I Wrestling Championships and lost only once during that season. He defeated University of Wyoming's Bryce Meredith by a score of 3-2 in the finals.  In the 2016 championships, he was the number 1 seed.

2017 season
Heil defended his title at the 2017 NCAA Division I Wrestling Championships, capping an undefeated season. He defeated University of Virginia's George DiCamillo 6-3 in the finals.

2018 season
Heil lost in the quarterfinals to eventual champion Yianni Diakomihalis of Cornell (who would go on to be the fifth four time NCAA champion) then lost his next match, finishing outside of All-American honors.

References

Living people
American male sport wrestlers
St. Edward High School (Lakewood, Ohio) alumni
Oklahoma State Cowboys wrestlers
People from Brunswick, Ohio
1995 births